World Domination Recordings was an indie rock record label founded by bass player and music entrepreneur Dave Allen in Los Angeles. From roughly 1989 to 1996 it released records by artists including Low Pop Suicide, The Elastic Purejoy, Stanford Prison Experiment, Perfume Tree, Latimer, Sky Cries Mary, Loop Guru, Sugar Plant, Contagion, and Noah Stone, and published a zine with essays by Allen and design by Ophelia Chong, called Clutter. More recently, Allen founded the label Pampelmoose.

References

See also
 List of record labels

Record labels established in 1989
Record labels disestablished in 1996
American independent record labels
Indie rock record labels